Jayne Atkinson (born 18 February 1959) is a British actress. She is best known for the role of Karen Hayes on 24, as well as her Tony Award–nominated roles in The Rainmaker and Enchanted April. She has also appeared in the CBS drama Criminal Minds as BAU Section Chief Erin Strauss, the CBS drama Madam Secretary as United States Vice President Teresa Hurst, and in the Netflix political drama House of Cards as U.S. Secretary of State Catherine Durant.

Early life
Atkinson was born on 18 February 1959 in Bournemouth, England. Her family moved to the United States in 1968 when she was 9 years old. She grew up in North Miami Beach, Florida, and graduated from Pine Crest School, where she was elected Homecoming Queen in 1977. She attended Northwestern University (BS Communications, 1981), where she was initiated as a member of Alpha Chi Omega and a sorority sister of Laura Innes; and graduated with an MFA from the Yale Drama School in 1985.

Career

After working in regional theatres, Atkinson appeared off-Broadway in the Manhattan Theatre Club's production of Bloody Poetry in 1987. She made her Broadway debut the same year in a revival of Arthur Miller's All My Sons. 

Subsequently, she landed title roles in more stage productions, which include Henry VIII, Tru, and The Art of Success. She earned a Drama Desk Award for Best Actress in a Play for her performance in The Skriker in 1996. Atkinson's work in the Roundabout Theatre Company's 1999 production of The Rainmaker earned her a Tony Award nomination, and her performance in the 2003 play Enchanted April earned her an Outer Critics Circle Award, another Tony Award nomination and a Drama Desk nomination.

In 2009, she starred as Ruth Condomine in a Broadway revival of Noël Coward's Blithe Spirit, which co-starred Rupert Everett, Christine Ebersole, and Angela Lansbury.

She has appeared in such films as Free Willy, Free Willy 2: The Adventure Home, 12 and Holding, Blank Check,
The Village and
Syriana. Her television acting credits include A Year in the Life, Parenthood, The X-Files, Law & Order, The Practice, Criminal Minds, 24, Gossip Girl and House of Cards, opposite Kevin Spacey and husband Michel Gill. Her performance in the made-for-TV movie Our Town garnered her a Satellite Award nomination for Best Supporting Actress.

Personal life

Atkinson is married to actor Michel Gill, with whom she has one son. Atkinson and Gill met when they appeared together in a 1989 production of The Heiress at the Long Wharf Theater in New Haven, Connecticut. They both appeared in House of Cards, though not as a couple: Gill played President Garrett Walker and Atkinson played Secretary of State Catherine Durant.

Filmography

Film

Television

Stage

References

External links

Jayne Atkinson at Lortel Archives: The Internet Off-Broadway Database

1959 births
Living people
Actresses from Florida
British emigrants to the United States
Northwestern University School of Communication alumni
People from Hollywood, Florida
Yale School of Drama alumni
21st-century American actresses
Pine Crest School alumni